Paula Elodie Hanson (born January 21, 1944) is an American politician in the state of Minnesota. She served in the Minnesota State Senate.

References

1944 births
Living people
Women state legislators in Minnesota
Minnesota state senators
21st-century American women